The United States House of Representative elections of 2004 in North Carolina were held on November 3, 2004 as part of the biennial election to the United States House of Representatives.  All thirteen seats in North Carolina, and 435 nationwide, were elected.

The parties' positions were unchanged.  The Democrats gained in the popular vote share across the state, thanks predominantly to running candidates in two districts they hadn't contested in 2002.  However, no districts changed hands.  Two new Republican representatives were elected to replace non-running incumbents: Patrick McHenry and Virginia Foxx.  G. K. Butterfield retained the seat that he had won in a special election earlier in the year.

It is not to be confused with the election to the North Carolina House of Representatives, which was held on the same day.

Summary

Results

Footnotes

2004
2004 North Carolina elections